The Parliament of the Republic of the Congo consists of two chambers:

The Senate (Upper Chamber)
The National Assembly (Lower Chamber)

See also
Politics of the Republic of the Congo
List of legislatures by country

External links
National Assembly

References

Congo, Republic of
Politics of the Republic of the Congo
Political organisations based in the Republic of the Congo
Government of the Republic of the Congo
Congo, Republic
Congo, Republic of